ABAJ may refer to:

 ABA Journal, monthly legal trade magazine
 Antiquarian Booksellers Association of Japan

See also
 Takalik Abaj, a pre-Columbian archaeological site in Guatemala